Adenanthos argyreus, commonly known as little woollybush, is a species of erect shrub endemic to southwest Western Australia.

It blooms between May and February producing pink-red flowers.

It is found among areas of low scrub in the southern Wheatbelt and Goldfields-Esperance regions of Western Australia where it grows in sandy-clay soils that can contain gravel.

References

External links
 

argyreus
Eudicots of Western Australia
Plants described in 1904